The Canton of Arles-sur-Tech is a French former canton of Pyrénées-Orientales department, in Languedoc-Roussillon. It had 7,197 inhabitants (2012). It was disbanded following the French canton reorganisation which came into effect in March 2015.

Composition
The canton of Arles-sur-Tech consisted of 8 communes:
Arles-sur-Tech 
Amélie-les-Bains-Palalda
Montferrer
Corsavy
Montbolo
Saint-Marsal
La Bastide
Taulis

References

Arles-sur-Tech
2015 disestablishments in France
States and territories disestablished in 2015